Rafael Q. Meza (born February 19, 1958) is an American retired jockey who competed in Thoroughbred horse racing in the United States.

A native of Tijuana, Mexico, Meza began riding in California near the end of the 1970s. and would spend his career riding from a base in that State. In 1982 he was the second- leading rider at the spring/summer meeting at Golden Gate Fields 
 and enjoyed his best year in racing in 1986 when he won six important races at tracks in California, New York and Louisiana.

References

1958 births
Living people
American jockeys
Mexican jockeys
Sportspeople from Tijuana
Mexican emigrants to the United States